Theodor Burkhardt (31 January 1905 – 14 March 1958) was a German international footballer.

References

1905 births
1958 deaths
Association football defenders
German footballers
Germany international footballers